Tony Young (1917 - 1966) was a British film director and television producer. His films include Penny Points to Paradise (1951), The Eternal Question (1956) and The Runaway (1963).

Penny Points to Paradise was the feature film debut of the stars of The Goon Show, Spike Milligan, Harry Secombe and Peter Sellers.

Young later went on to produce The Telegoons for BBC Television.

Selected filmography
Director
 My Death Is a Mockery (1952)
 Port of Escape (1956)
 Hidden Homicide (1959)

References

External links

1917 births
1966 deaths
British film directors